is a Japanese former professional footballer who played as a forward. He made 22 appearances scoring 5 goals for Japan national team between 2005 and 2008.

Club career
Oguro joined the J1 League in 1999, with Gamba Osaka. He was loaned to Consadole Sapporo for the 2001 season, and returned to Gamba having impressed many in Osaka. In 2004, Oguro scored the second-highest number of goals in the J1 League, and the highest number of all Japanese-born players.
In Chinese characters, Oguro's name resembles that of the god Daikokuten, giving him that nickname. Gamba Osaka's official merchandise store has come to be called the Shrine of Daikokuten. In 2005, Oguro was the sixth top J1 League scorer, and helped lead Gamba Osaka to the J1 League championship.

In December 2005, Oguro was signed by French club Grenoble, where he appeared in 17 Ligue 2 matches.

In August 2006, Oguro was transferred to Italian club Torino.

In June 2008, Oguro returned to Japan and moved to J1 League side Tokyo Verdy. However he could scored only two goals and Verdy was relegated to J2 League. In 2009, he played in J2 League first time and scored 21 goals. However the club finished at 7th place and could not return to J1. In 2010, Oguro moved to J2 club Yokohama FC and scored 12 goals in 16 matches until June. In June 2010, Oguro moved to J1 club FC Tokyo. In 2011, Oguro transferred to J1 club Yokohama F. Marinos. He scored ten goals in 2011 season. However he could scored only two goals in 2012 season.

In 2013, initially Oguro was registered in Yokohama F. Marinos (His registration was deleted in March). However on 4 February, Oguro moved to Chinese Super League side Hangzhou Greentown for the 2013 season, and rejoined manager Takeshi Okada, whom he played under at Consadole Sapporo and Japan national team.

In January 2014, Oguro returned to Japan and signed with J2 club Kyoto Sanga FC. he scored 42 goals in two seasons. In 2016, he moved to Montedio Yamagata on loan. In 2017, he returned to Sanga. In 2018, he moved to Tochigi SC.

International career
Oguro was chosen for the Japan national team in 2005 for the 2006 World Cup qualifying games. During his second game for the team on 9 February, Oguro scored the second goal in injury time to help Japan to a 2–0 win over North Korea in the final game of Asian qualification. In 2005, Oguro was the fifth top scorer for the Japanese national team. In May 2006, Oguro was called up to play for Japan in the 2006 World Cup in Germany. He played 22 games and scored 5 goals for Japan until 2008.

Career statistics

Club

International

Scores and results list Japan's goal tally first, score column indicates score after each Oguro goal.

Honors
Gamba Osaka
 J1 League: 2005

FC Tokyo
Suruga Bank Championship: 2010

Individual
 J.League Best Eleven: 2004

References

External links
 
 
 
 Japan National Football Team Database
 

1980 births
Living people
Association football people from Osaka Prefecture
People from Toyonaka, Osaka
Japanese footballers
Association football forwards
Japan international footballers
2005 FIFA Confederations Cup players
2006 FIFA World Cup players
J1 League players
J2 League players
Ligue 2 players
Serie A players
Chinese Super League players
Gamba Osaka players
Hokkaido Consadole Sapporo players
Grenoble Foot 38 players
Torino F.C. players
Tokyo Verdy players
Yokohama FC players
FC Tokyo players
Yokohama F. Marinos players
Zhejiang Professional F.C. players
Kyoto Sanga FC players
Montedio Yamagata players
Tochigi SC players
Japanese expatriate footballers
Japanese expatriate sportspeople in France
Expatriate footballers in France
Japanese expatriate sportspeople in Italy
Expatriate footballers in Italy
Japanese expatriate sportspeople in China
Expatriate footballers in China